Parrs Wood House is an 18th-century Georgian villa in the Parrs Wood area of Didsbury, Manchester, England. It was described by Pevsner as "a poorer man's Heaton Hall." It was designated a Grade II* listed building on 25 February 1952.

The "white stucco mansion" consists of a "square main block with (two) unequal service wings on (the) north side. It is of two storeys and [three] bays [with] a three-window service range to the left."  The architect of the house is unknown, but "it may have been designed by a member of the Wyatt family". Parrs Wood House was bought in 1795 by Richard Farrington, whose brother, the diarist and artist Joseph Farrington, died there after falling down the stairs of the Church of St James, Didsbury, in 1821.

From 1825 Parrs Wood House was home to the Tory  MP James Heald (1796–1873). Heald was a member of the Wesleyan Methodist Church and a prominent philanthropist, supporting a number of charitable causes. He was elected MP for Stockport in 1847 alongside Richard Cobden. Following his death, St Paul's Methodist Church, Didsbury was erected as a memorial to him. James Heald did not marry and had no children. The Parrs Wood estate passed to his nephew after his death, and remained in the family until in the 1920s, when it was sold to the Manchester Corporation, on the provision that it would be used for educational purposes. The estate later became the location of Parrs Wood High School and Parrs Wood Rural Studies Centre.

The mansion was formerly the music building and is now the sixth-form centre of Parrs Wood High School. In 2000, much of the school land was sold to property developers who built a large entertainment complex, changing the area "from a semi-rural educational enclave into a leisure complex". During the redevelopment, Parrs Wood House suffered damage and theft, and the original stables burnt down.

See also

Grade II* listed buildings in Greater Manchester
Listed buildings in Manchester-M20

Notes

References

Grade II* listed buildings in Manchester
Houses in Manchester
Georgian architecture in England
Grade II* listed houses
Neoclassical architecture in England